The 1961–62 Eastern Professional Hockey League season was the third season of the Eastern Professional Hockey League, a North American minor professional league. Six teams participated in the regular season, and the Hull-Ottawa Canadians were the league champions.

Regular season

Playoffs

External links
 Statistics on hockeydb.com

Eastern Professional Hockey League (1959–1963) seasons
EPHL